Ardrishaig  is a coastal village on Loch Gilp, at the southern (eastern) entrance to the Crinan Canal in Argyll and Bute in the west of Scotland. It lies immediately to the south of Lochgilphead, with the nearest larger town being Oban.

History
Àird Driseig or Rubha Àird Driseig, the Scottish Gaelic versions of the name, mean "height of the small bramble" or "promontory of the small bramble".

Ardrishaig harbour's first pier was built in 1873.

In the 1970s, the village was significantly altered when a row of old houses and shops on the lochside of the main street was demolished to make way for a car park.  Most trading now takes place in the neighbouring town Lochgilphead.

The village was a filming location for the television series A Mug's Game.

Governance
Ardrishaig historically fell within the South Knapdale parish, and is now served by Ardrishaig Community Council. It has been administered since 1996 by Argyll and Bute Council, falling within the Mid Argyll ward, which is represented by three councillors. The Scottish Parliament constituency is Argyll and Bute, which is represented by Michael Russell. The UK Parliament constituency is Argyll and Bute, which is represented by Brendan O'Hara.

Geography
Ardrishaig lies on the side of a hill (the Cruach nam Bonnach face of Cruach Breacain) bordering the west side of Loch Gilp, just north of where it joins Loch Fyne. The Crinan Canal runs north–south through Ardrishaig, with locks and a basin at its southern terminus.

Ardrishaig Community Council is part-owner of the wind farm at Allt Dearg on the hill above Inverneill to the south of the town.

Demography
Ardrishaig had 1,283 inhabitants in 2001.

Landmarks

Crinan Canal and harbour
There are two piers, a lighthouse, slipway and breakwater along the seafront. Scottish Canals has an office by the canal basin. To the north side of the old pier is the Crinan Canal sea lock and to the south are pontoons and anchorage for boats. About 30,000 tonnes of timber pass through the harbour annually but it has the capacity for 150,000 tonnes.

Other landmarks
Facilities in the village include a hotel, public houses, a church, school, post office and antiques shops. There are two public telephone boxes and a public lavatory.

Education
Ardrishaig Primary School is located in the village, and serves the area between Erins and Millers Bridge. The present building dates from 1986. For secondary education, the village falls within the catchment area of Lochgilphead Joint Campus.

Notable people
John Smith, former Labour MP and Leader of the Opposition, was born in Ardrishaig.

James Chalmers, pioneering missionary, was born and lived in Ardrishaig until he was seven years old

See also 
 Ardkinglas Railway
 Glenfyne/Glendarroch/Glengilp distillery
 List of listed buildings in South Knapdale, Argyll and Bute
 List of places in Argyll and Bute

References

External links

Highlands and Islands of Scotland
Villages in Knapdale
Ports and harbours of Scotland